Dimitrie Ivanov (September 24, 1944 – 1998) was a Romanian sprint canoer who competed in the late 1960s and early 1970s. At the 1968 Summer Olympics in Mexico City, he won a silver medal in the K-4 1000 m event.

Ivanov also won a silver medal in the K-1 4 x 500 m event at the 1971 ICF Canoe Sprint World Championships in Belgrade.

References

1944 births
1998 deaths
Romanian male canoeists
Romanian people of Russian descent
Olympic canoeists of Romania
Olympic silver medalists for Romania
Olympic medalists in canoeing
Canoeists at the 1968 Summer Olympics
Medalists at the 1968 Summer Olympics
ICF Canoe Sprint World Championships medalists in kayak